Monegasque Action (AM) was a political alliance in Monaco.

History
The alliance was established as a coalition of voters to support a communist candidate in the 1973 elections. It aimed to introduce younger people into politics in the principality, and was successful in having its candidate elected. It did not contest any further elections.

References

Communist front organizations
Communist parties in Europe
Defunct political parties in Monaco
United fronts